Prusy  is a village in the administrative district of Gmina Stopnica, within Busko County, Świętokrzyskie Voivodeship, in south-central Poland, approximately  northwest of Stopnica,  east of Busko-Zdrój, and  southeast of the regional capital Kielce.

References

Prusy